Brockton is a municipality in the Canadian province of Ontario, located in Bruce County. , the population was 9,461.

The current municipality was formed on January 1, 1999, by amalgamating the former township of Brant, former township of Greenock and the town of Walkerton. Brockton's name was formed as a portmanteau of the three merged municipalities (Brant Greenock Walkerton).

Communities
Communities in the Municipality of Brockton include the former town of Walkerton and the villages within the boundaries of the two former Brant and Greenock Townships: Bradley, Cargill, Chepstow, Dunkeld, Eden Grove, Glammis, Greenock, Little Egypt, Malcolm, Maple Hill, Narva, Marle Lake, Lake Rosalind, Pearl Lake, Pinkerton, Portal, Riversdale and Solway.

Mayors
David Thomson (1999-2003)
Charlie Bagnato (2003-2010)
David Inglis (2010–2018)
Chris Peabody (2018–present)

Demographics 

Mother tongue:
 English as first language: 95.2%
 French as first language: 0.2%
 English and French as first language: 0%
 Other as first language: 4.5%

Population trend:
 Population in 2016: 9,461
 Population in 2011: 9,432
 Population in 2006: 9,641
 Population in 2001: 9,658
 Population total in 1996: 10,163
 Brant (township): 3,455
 Greenock (township): 1,672
 Walkerton (town): 5,036
 Population in 1991:
 Brant (township): 3,420
 Greenock (township): 1,741
 Walkerton (town): 4,939

See also
Bruce County municipal elections, 2010
List of townships in Ontario

References

External links

Lower-tier municipalities in Ontario
Municipalities in Bruce County